This article contains a list of fossil-bearing stratigraphic units in the state of Montana, U.S.

Sites

See also

 Paleontology in Montana

References

 

Montana
Stratigraphic units
Stratigraphy of Montana
Montana geography-related lists
United States geology-related lists